Bauza Island lies immediately south of the much larger Secretary Island in the outer reaches of Doubtful Sound / Patea, in Fiordland National Park on New Zealand's South Island. The less than one kilometre wide Patea passage to the south of the island is the main entrance to Doubtful Sound. The waters between the two islands are protected by the Te Awaatu Channel (The Gut) Marine Reserve. Doubtful Sound tour boats routinely travel through this channel.

Bauza Island is uninhabited and named after Felipe Bauzá, the main cartographer of the Malaspina Expedition to the Americas, Oceania and Australasia between 1789 and 1794.

Conservation
Although Bauza Island is relatively small, it has a high conservation value, with pristine native bush and the only animal pest to have ever made it onto the island being stoats. Stoats were eradicated with a pest trapping campaign between 2002 and 2004, with over 40 traps along tracks following the main ridge of the island. Bauza Island is one of only nine islands in the Fiordland region with no animal pests.

In 2003, before stoats had been eradicated, a group of endangered saddleback (tieke) were transferred to the island, but subsequently killed by stoat.  Following the stoat eradication, another 39 of the birds were successfully transferred from Breaksea Island and released on Bauza Island in 2010.

See also

 Desert island
 List of islands

References

External links

Uninhabited islands of New Zealand
Islands of Fiordland
Fiordland National Park